Alen Mujanovič (born 11 November 1976) is a retired Slovenian footballer.

External links
Profile at Prvaliga 

1976 births
Living people
Slovenian footballers
Association football forwards
NK Maribor players
NK Rudar Velenje players
Slovenian Second League players
Slovenian PrvaLiga players
Place of birth missing (living people)
Slovenian people of Bosnia and Herzegovina descent